This is a list of women that have been elected as Members of Parliament (MPs) to the House of Representatives of Jamaica from 1944 to present.

See also
 Women in the House of Representatives of Jamaica

References

Parliament of Jamaica
Lists of women politicians
Lists of women legislators
female members of the House of Representatives